Lieblein is a surname, and may refer to:

 Franz Kaspar (Caspar) Lieblein (1744, Karlstadt am Main - 1810), German botanist
 Jens (Daniel Carolus) Lieblein (1827–1911), Norwegian Egyptologist and magazine editor
 (Johan Nicolai) Severin Lieblein (1866, Kristiania - 1933), Norwegian writer; son of Jens

See also 
 Lieblein House, single-family house located at 525 Quincy Street in Hancock, Michigan
 Liebel (Liebl)
 Liebling (disambiguation)
 Liebler
 Lieblich (disambiguation)

German-language surnames